Isiolo Airport , also Isiolo International Airport is an airport located in Isiolo, Isiolo County, and Meru County, Kenya.

Location
Isiolo Airport is located on the border of Isiolo, in Isiolo County with half of the runway extending into Meru County. The airport sits on a piece of land that measures  and its passenger terminal building measures . The geographic coordinates of this airport are:0° 20' 37.00"N, 37° 35' 16.00"E (Latitude:0.343610; Longitude:37.587778).

Overview
Isiolo Airport is a civilian airport, serving Isiolo, Meru and surrounding communities. In February 2013, Kenyan media reports indicated that the airport was undergoing renovations and improvements to International status. The renovations are expected to conclude in the second half of 2016. Official opening of the renovated facility is scheduled for January 2017.

Airlines and destinations
No airlines fly to Isiolo as of 2014, but the airport is being expanded.  Isiolo is planning to become a resort city in Kenya, which would motivate airlines to fly here in the future. As of January 2018, according to the Airport manager, Mohamed Lippi, only one airline, Fly Sax Airlines, was operating from this airport, offering passenger flights only.

See also
 Kenya Airports Authority
 Kenya Civil Aviation Authority
 List of airports in Kenya

References

External links
   Website of Kenya Airports Authority

Airports in Kenya
Isiolo County
Meru County